The Solarpark Alt Daber is a photovoltaic facility in Germany generating 67.8 megawatts (MW, 90,900 hp). It was completed 3 December 2011, for a cost of €100 million, and is expected to produce 71 GWh/year. It is on a former military airport.

In 2014 a prototype of a battery storage system was added, mainly to provide frequency-response.

See also

Energy policy of the European Union
Photovoltaics
Renewable energy commercialization
Renewable energy in the European Union

References

External links
  (in German)

Alt Daber
Economy of Brandenburg
2011 establishments in Germany